Christopher Francis Stark (born 12 March 1987) is a British radio personality known for his work most recently as a co-host on the Scott Mills show on BBC Radio 1 until he departed in 2022. He currently works on Capital Breakfast as co-presenter and executive producer.

Broadcasting career

Early career
Stark was born in Watford and raised in Pinner, north-west London. Stark started working at Radio Northwick Park, a hospital radio station, at the age of 16 and gained experience working at stations including Galaxy, Real Radio, Virgin Radio and BBC 6 Music. Previous to this he attended Watford Grammar School. At 18, Stark started at the University of Southampton where he studied politics and zoology. While at Southampton, Stark was given his own show on the student radio station, Surge.

Radio 1
Stark officially joined the Scott Mills show on 2 April 2012, but occasionally appeared on the show as 'Scott's friend Chris' for a period of time prior to this. Stark participated in most of the show's ongoing features including Real or No Real, Innuendo Bingo, 24 Years at the Tap End, Bamboleo Wednesday.

On 1 July 2022, it was announced that Mills and Stark would both be leaving Radio 1 after respectively 24 years and 10 years on air. Mills left to replace Steve Wright in the afternoon on BBC Radio 2, which he hosted on that station for more than 20 years, and Stark left to join Capital Breakfast. The move also confirmed the duo's departure from BBC Radio 5 Live after nearly three years. Their last shows on Radio 1 and 5 Live were broadcast in August 2022.

24 Years at the Tap End
Stark is known for the feature 24 Years at the Tap End, in which he reads excerpts from his "autobography" (a deliberately humorous colloquial mispronunciation of "autobiography"). He was originally inspired to write his own autobiography after reading the autobiography of Brendan Sheerin from Coach Trip. The title refers to his on-air realisation, at age 24, that he had been sitting at the "wrong" end of the bath his whole life. The first episode aired on 11 November 2011. In this episode, Stark revealed that his parents had originally planned to name him "Padraig". Throughout the series, Stark recounts memorable events from his "years at the tap end" which often include mistakes made and life lessons learned through adventures with his friends. The second series of the show concluded in 2013, with no plans for a third. However, a one-off special aired in January 2014 as part of a comedy night on Radio One. This late night edition, Tap End: Unplugged, aired live In front of a studio audience and featured a live rendition of the theme tune. The late airing allowed Stark to reveal the full story of a holiday to Prague he had discussed in a previous episode, telling parts which were considered "too rude for daytime" and using strong language. These were repeated during 2020.

Mila Kunis interview
In March 2013, Stark was sent with ten minutes' notice to a media junket for the film Oz the Great and Powerful to interview American actress Mila Kunis for the Scott Mills Show. The interview caught the attention of the world's media, as the only thing Stark asked Kunis about the film was, "In the nicest possible way, did you enjoy being ugly for once?", referring the fact that Kunis' character Theodora becomes the Wicked Witch of the West. He then went on to discuss his local pub, local football club (Watford FC), Nando's and drinking games with his friends (inviting Kunis to all four). Eventually a person came out and told them that they need to do the interview, and Kunis quickly answered all the questions that other people had asked her and that Stark would have asked her about the film. Stark then invited Kunis to his friend's wedding. The video was posted to YouTube by BBC Radio 1 and subsequently went viral. Within days, it had been viewed by ten million people and Stark himself was interviewed by American entertainment and news shows such as Access Hollywood and CNN's Starting Point with Soledad O'Brien.

Television
In November 2013, Channel 4 announced they had commissioned an hour long, one-off documentary special which would feature Stark attempting to interview his ultimate bucket list of celebrities, including Derek Acorah, Rachel Stevens, Emma Thompson, Colin Farrell, Ricky Hatton and Verne Troyer. This aired on 10 February 2014.

From 2014 until 2016, Stark was a team captain on the E4 show, Virtually Famous. In 2015, Stark appeared as a guest on the CBBC panel show The Dog Ate My Homework. In December 2016, he took part in an episode of Celebrity Mastermind and a celebrity edition of Robot Wars.

In 2017, Stark appeared a guest on the CBBC Saturday morning show Saturday Mash-Up!. In the episode of Saturday Mash-Up, it was revealed that Chris was actually a contestant in the seventh series of BBC children's game show Get Your Own Back, who lost to fellow contestant Nazia, but presenter Yasmin surprised Chris, by bringing back Andy the Barber and returning the favour by gunging him.

That Peter Crouch Podcast
In 2018, along with Peter Crouch and Tom Fordyce, Stark became a co-host of the That Peter Crouch Podcast.. This has become a success with over five series being created. The podcast returned in 2022 where it moved from the BBC to Acast.

Capital FM
In July 2022 it was announced that Stark would join Capital Breakfast with Roman Kemp, Sonny Jay and Sian Welby in the autumn, he began his presenting role on 10 October 2022.

Personal life
Stark is a supporter of local team Watford F.C.

Stark is married to Ria Holland. They have a daughter, Erin, born in 2015 and in July 2020, Stark announced on the radio show that his wife gave birth to their son Troy.

References

External links
March 2012 Interview with Chris Stark by Soton Tab
Chris Stark featured in an April 2012 Newsbeat report on heart screenings
2014 interview with Chris Stark by Soton Tab

Living people
Radio presenters from London
BBC people
English radio personalities
Alumni of the Student Radio Association
1987 births
Alumni of the University of Southampton
People from Watford